Herman U.S.A. is a 2001 American romantic comedy directed by Bill Semans.

Synopsis

In a small Minnesota town, seventy-eight bachelor farmers advertise for companionship, leading to a response far outstripping expectations.

Cast
Michael O'Keefe as Dennis
Kevin Chamberlin as Wayne
Enid Graham as Dorrie
Ann Hamilton as Sharon
Garth Schumacher as Walter
Wally Dunn as Sigurd
Anthony Mockus Sr. as Arvid
Christina Rouner as June
Marjie Rynearson as Lillian
Kim Sykes as Kim
Richard Wharton as Vern
Mark Benninghoffen as Rick
Suzanne Warmanen as Nancy
Tom Price as Harry
Brian Baumgartner as Roger
Michael D. Bang as Michael O'Keefe's (Dennis') station wagon driver; long-haired country-boy

Background

Herman U.S.A. was filmed in a real small town in Minnesota called New Germany. The crew painted over the water tower to read "Herman U. S. A." The town of Herman, Minnesota did not have enough hotel space to fit the entire cast and crew members.

External links
 
 
 

2001 films
Films set in Minnesota
Films shot in Minnesota
2001 romantic comedy films
American romantic comedy films
2000s English-language films
2000s American films